Alaskan Russian, known locally as Old Russian, is a dialect of  Russian, influenced by Eskimo–Aleut languages, spoken by Alaskan Creoles. Today it is prevalent on Kodiak Island and in Ninilchik (Kenai Peninsula), Alaska; it has been isolated from other varieties of Russian for over a century.

Kodiak Russian, was natively spoken on Afognak Strait until the Great Alaskan earthquake and tsunami of 1964. It is now moribund, spoken by only a handful of elderly people, and virtually undocumented.

Ninilchik Russian is better studied and more vibrant, though also moribund. It developed from the  Russian colonial settlement of the village of Ninilchik in 1847.

Vocabulary
Ninilchik Russian vocabulary is clearly Russian with a few borrowings from English and Alaskan native languages.

Here are some examples of Alaskan Russian from the village of Ninilchik:

Éta moy dom. ‘This is my house’.

Aná óchin krasíwaya. ‘She is very pretty’.

Aná nas lúbit. ‘She loves us’.

Éta moy mush. ‘This is my husband’.

Bózhi moy! ‘My God!’.

On moy brat. ‘He is my brother’.

U miné nimnóshka Rúskay krof. ‘I have a little Russian blood’.

References

languages of Alaska
Russian-based pidgins and creoles
Russian dialects
Slavic languages spoken in North America